Khusrau (died 712) was the ruler of the Afrighid dynasty of Khwarezm briefly in 712. He was the relative and successor of Azkajwar II.

Nothing is known about the early life of Khusrau, although he was probably a member of the Afrighid family. In 712, an anti-Abbasid rebellion broke out in Khwarazm, which resulted in the overthrow and death of king Azkajwar II, who had agreed to become a vassal of the Abbasids. Khusrau claimed the throne. However, the Abbasids invaded Khwarazm and ravaged the region, brutally massacring the rebels and burning several important objects of the Khwarazmian culture. Khusrau was killed and was replaced by Azkajwar's son Askajamuk II as the new ruler of the kingdom.

References
 
 
 

712 deaths
Year of birth unknown
8th-century Iranian people
Afrighids
Zoroastrian rulers